Dale Keenan (born 27 June 1994) is a Scottish professional footballer, who plays for Troon in the West of Scotland Super League First Division.

Keenan has previously played for Partick Thistle and Stranraer with loan spells at East Fife and Ayr United.

Playing career

Celtic
A Celtic supporter in his youth, Dale spent the early years of his career on the books of Celtic, but was released before he reached the senior ranks.

Partick Thistle
Keenan joined the then Scottish First Division club Partick Thistle as a modern apprentice in summer 2011. A versatile youngster, Dale played in a number of positions across the defence and defensive midfield and starred in various roles with the Development Squad.

Dale spent 2012-13 on loan at East Fife before returning to Thistle in 2013 (when the club were promoted to the Scottish Premiership), where Keenan played in the successful Thistle U20 squad.

In the summer of 2014, Keenan played in a pre-season friendly against a Sunderland XI and subsequently made his first team league debut the following month, replacing the injured Jordan McMillan in the early stages of a 1–1 draw against Dundee at Dens Park on 16 August 2014. Dale put in a brave performance as 10 man Thistle managed to salvage a well earned point. He made his first league start for Partick Thistle on 23 August 2014, at Firhill against Hamilton Academical.

The signing of Jake Carroll in August 2014 saw Dale look to go out on loan in search of first-team football, and he joined Ayr United. Upon return from that loan spell, Dale was called upon on a couple of occasions putting in dependable performances when drafted in to the squad, usually on short notice.

Dale was released by Partick Manager Alan Archibald at the end of the 2014/15 season, despite scooping the McCrea Financial Services Young Player of the Year award for the season.

East Fife
A raw 18 year-old, Dale spent season 2012-13 on loan at East Fife to experience first-team football under Billy Brown.

Ayr United
On 14 November 2014, Keenan signed on loan for Ayr United under then Manager Mark Roberts, where he would only make 2 appearances before returning to Firhill.

Stranraer
After leaving Partick Thistle, Keenan enjoyed a trial spell at Scottish League One side Stranraer and was signed on a one-year deal by Stair Park Manager Brian Reid on 17 July 2015.

Troon
Dale originally signed for Troon in February 2016 on a loan deal until the end of the season, when his contract with Stranraer expired. He impressed sufficiently in this spell to be offered a two-year contract at Portland Park as the Seasiders looked to continue their upward trajectory.

20 minutes into his first match of his permanent spell at the club, a pre-season friendly against Ardeer Thistle, Dale suffered a serious cruciate ligament injury to his knee which saw him facing a major operation and forced him to spend the remainder of that season & the beginning of the next on the sidelines.

References

External links

Living people
Scottish footballers
Footballers from Glasgow
1994 births
Partick Thistle F.C. players
Scottish Football League players
Association football midfielders
East Fife F.C. players
Ayr United F.C. players
Stranraer F.C. players
Troon F.C. players
Scottish Professional Football League players
Scottish Junior Football Association players